The Radhika Krishnashtaka (also called the Radhashtak) is a hymn. It is said that the reciter can get to Krishna via his consort Radha by chanting it. As it is composed of eight verses it is known as ashtak, ashta means eight. It is recited mainly by vaishnavas. Members of the Swaminarayan Sampraday recite this daily as it is prescribed in the Satsangi Jeevan (P.4, A.48). BAPS members do not recite this version but instead recite created version called Shri Swaminarayan Ashtakam. This is due to the use of words such as ‘Venu, Vraja, Vrindavan, Gop-Gopi, Nanad, etc., that BAPS does not believe would be applicable to Swaminarayan. Followers of the Swaminarayan Sampraday maintain that even Gunatitanand Swami recited the original ashtak every day and is established in the Satsangi Jeevan for all Satsangi's to recite.

Lyrics

Navinajimutasamanavarnam, ratnollasat kumdalasobhikarnam;

Mahakiritagramayuraparna, Shri radhikakrishnamaham namami (Chorus) .. 1

Nidhaya pani dvitiyena venum nijadhare sekharayatarenum;

ninadayantam ca gatau karenum, Shri radhikakrishnamaham namami .. 2

vissuddhahemojjvapittavistram hatariyutham ca vinapisastram;

vyarthikrtanekasuradvidastram, Shri radhikakrishnamaham namami .. 3

adharmatisyadinasadhupalam, sddhrmavairasurasamghakalam;

puspadimalam vrajarajabalam, Shri radhikakrishnamaham namami .. 4

gopipriyarammbhitarasakhelam, rasesvariramjanakrtprahelam;

skandhollasatkumacinhacelam, Shri radhikakrishnamaham namami .. 5

vrmdavane pritataya vasantam, nijascitanpada uddharantam;

gogopagopirabhinamdayantam, Shri radhikakrishnamaham namami .. 6

visvadvisanmamathadarpaharam, samsarijivasrayaniyasamsram;

sdaiva satpurusaukhyakaram, Shri radhikakrishnamaham namami .. 7

ananditatmavrajavasitokam, namdadisamdarsatadivyalokam;

vinasitasvasritajivasokam, Shri radhikakrishnamaham namami .. 8 

IN HINDI FONTS.

नवीनजीमूतसमाना वर्णम , रत्नोल्लसत  कुंडल सोभीकरणम ;
महाकिरीटाग्रमयूरपर्ण, श्री राधिकाकृष्णा महं  नमामि  (कोरस )   .. १

निधाय पाणीद्वितीयेन वेणुं,  निजाधरे शेखरयातरेणुम ; 
निनादयन्तं च गतौ करेणुम, श्री राधिकाकृष्णमहं नमामि  .. २

विशुद्धहेमोज्जवलपित्तवस्त्रम हतारियूथं च विनापि शस्त्रं ;
व्यर्थीकृतानेकसुरद्विडस्त्रं , श्री राधिकाकृष्णमहं नमामि  .. ३

अधर्मतीश्यारदिनसाधुपालं, सद्धर्मवैरासुरसंघकालं  ;
पुष्पादिमालं व्रजराजबालं , श्री राधिकाकृष्णमहं  नमामि  .. ४

गोपीप्रियारंम्भितरासखेलं , रासेश्वरीरंजनकृतप्रहेलम ;
स्कन्धोंल्लस सतकुंकुंम चिन्ह चेलं, श्री राधिकाकृष्णा महं  नमामि  .. ५

वृन्दावने प्रीततया वसन्तं , निजाश्रितानापद ऊद्धरन्तं ;  
गोगोपगोपीरभिनंदयन्तं , श्री राधिकाकृष्णा महं नमामि  .. ६

विष्वद्विषण्ममथदर्पहारं , संसारिजीवांश्रयणीयसंसारम ;
सदैव  सत्पुरुसौख्यकारं , श्री राधिकाकृष्णा महं  नमामि  .. ७

आनन्दितात्मव्रजवासितोकं , नंदादिसंदर्शितदिव्यलोकं ;
विनासितस्वांश्रीतजिवशोकं ,  श्री राधिकाकृष्णा महं  नमामि  .. ८

Translation

Whose bodily complexion is like the dark monsoon clouds, Whose ears are decorated with earrings bedecked with various gems and diamonds;

Who is decorated with peacock feathers in the front of His helmet, Shree is Laxmi, So I pay my obeisances to Shree RadhaKrishna along with Laxmiji .. 1

His turban is decorated with different beautiful flowers, whose scented pollen is falling on the flute imparting its fragrance to the flute.

I pay my obeisances to Shree Krishna along with Radhika and Laxmi, who with His one hand is holding the fragrant flute on His lips and with the other plays it very sweetly .. 2

He is wearing bright yellow cloth which is effulgent like pure gold, He who is annihilating many demons without the use of any weapons;

He who has failed all the weapons and techniques used by His enemies, I pay my obeisances to Shree RadhaKrishna along with Laxmiji .. 3

He is the protector of all the saintly people who are being harassed by the irreligiosity, He who is death personified for the people who are not following the prescribed Bhagvat Dharma.

He who is decorated by garlands of various flowers, and who is the son of king of Vraja, that is Nanda Maharaj, I pay my obeisances to Shree RadhaKrishna along with Laxmiji .. 4

He who is playing the rasa dance with His beloved devotees - gopis, He is playing this rasa dance to satisfy His devotees who are expert at rasa dance;

He is wearing on His shoulder, a cloth decorated with kumkum (red powder) marks,  I pay my obeisances to Shree RadhaKrishna along with Laxmiji .. 5

He who is residing in Vrindavan with great love, He is the ultimate protector (in all circumstances) of all those who has surrendered unto His Lotus Feet completely;

He who is giving transcendental pleasure to cows, cowherd men and women of Vraja, I pay my obeisances to Shree RadhaKrishna along with Laxmiji .. 6

He who has conquered Kamadev (the cupid) who is the enemy of every living entity and is controlling them, He who is the ultimate shelter of everey living entity in this world full of miseries;

He who is the giver of pleasure to everyone following religion and regulative principles, I pay my obeisances to ShreeShree RadhaKrishna along with Laxmiji .. 7

He who is always giving pleasure to the residents of Vraja by His transcendental pastimes, He who is mercifully showing His Dhama (residence) to Nanda and other devotees;

He who diminishes the sadness of the living entity surrendered to His Lotus Feet, I pay my obeisances to Shree RadhaKrishna along with Laxmiji .. 8 

[ गुजराती में मुक्त भावानुवाद :  हिंदी फोन्ट में ]

चोमासाना मेघ समान जेना देहनु लालित्य छे ; जेना कर्ण पर रत्नो अने हिरा-जड़ित कुण्डल सुशोभित थयेला छे; जेना मुगुट नो अग्र भाग मोर-पिच्छथी शोभायमान छे ; एवा श्री राधा-कृष्ण सहित लक्ष्मीजीने मारा दंडवत प्रणाम करू छु. [ १ ]

जेमनी पाघ विधविध सुन्दर फूलो थी शणगारेल छे ; सुगन्धित पुष्प-रेणु  वांसळी  पर पड़ी तेनी सुवास नो वांसळी ने परिचय करावे छे ; जेना हाथमा धारण करेली वांसळीनी खुशबु तेमना होठ थकी मधुर सुर रेलावे छे, एवा श्री राधा-कृष्ण सहित लक्ष्मीजीने मारा दंडवत प्रणाम करू छु. [ २ ]

जेमणे पीळाचटक देदीप्यमान शुद्ध सुवर्ण जेवा वस्त्रो धारण कर्या छे; जेणे घणाज राक्षसों नो एक पण आयुध ना उपयोग वगर सर्वनाश करयो छे ;जेमणे तेमना दुश्मनो द्वारा वपराता तमाम आयुधो अने रणनीति ने निष्क्रिय करि दिधी  छे, एवा श्री राधा-कृष्ण सहित लक्ष्मीजीने मारा दंडवत प्रणाम करू छु. [ ३ ]

अधार्मिकता धरावनार व्यक्तिओ थी, पुण्यषाळी लोको नु रक्षण करनार ; अने भागवत-धर्म नु पालन नहीं करनार लोको माटे मृत्यु-दूत समान छे ; के जेमणे फूलो थी शणगारेल हार धारण करेल छे ; अने जे  व्रजना राजा नन्द महाराजना पुत्र छे , एवा श्री राधा-कृष्ण सहित लक्ष्मीजीने मारा दंडवत प्रणाम करू छु. [ ४ ]

जे,तेमना प्रिय/वहाला भक्तो-गोपिओ; रास रमवामा निपुण एवा भक्तोना आनंद माटे तेओनी साथे रास रमे छे ; कुमकुम वडे शणगारेलो खेस जेना खभे धारण करेल छे , एवा श्री  राधा-कृष्ण सहित लक्ष्मीजीने मारा दंडवत प्रणाम करू छु. [५]

वृन्दावनमा जे खूब आनंद-प्रमोद मा रहे छे ; जेओ तेमना चरण-कमळ मा न्योछावर थयेला लोकोने दरेक संकट मा परम रक्षण आपनार छे; जे गायोने, व्रज  ना गोपालको अने गोपिओ ने नौतम आनंद आपे छे, एवा श्री  राधा-कृष्ण सहित लक्ष्मीजीने मारा दंडवत प्रणाम करू छु.    [६]

प्रत्येक जीवात्मा ना दुश्मन बनीने जेणे वश करि लीधा छे,एवा "कामदेव" पर जेमणे विजय प्राप्त कर्यो  छे ; दुःखोथी भरेला आ जगतमा जेमणे प्रत्येक जिवात्माने परम आश्रय आप्यो छे ; जेओ धर्म अने नित्य नियमो नु पालन करनार माटे आनंदनो दाता छे , एवा श्री  राधा-कृष्ण सहित लक्ष्मीजीने मारा दंडवत प्रणाम करू छु. [७]

जेमनी उत्कृष्ट लीलाओ व्रजवासिओने हमेशा सुख प्रदान करे छे ; जे करुणाशील थईने  नन्द अने अन्य भक्तोने तेमना "धाम" ना दर्शन करावे छे ; जे जीवात्माओ तेमना चरण - कमळ नई शरणे आवे छे तेओना दुःखो  कॉपी छे   एवा श्री  राधा-कृष्ण सहित लक्ष्मीजीने मारा दंडवत प्रणाम करू छु. [८]

See also

 Krishna
 Radha
 RadhaKrishna

References

Krishna
Swaminarayan Sampradaya